Dmitry Leonidovich Gridin (born March 4, 1968), known as The Lifter, is a Soviet serial killer who killed three girls in 1989.

Biography 
Little is known about Gridin's early life. It is known that he was born into a family well-respected in the city. His father was the head of the workshop at the Magnitogorsk Iron and Steel Works, and Gridin was a student at the Magnitogorsk State Technical University, was married, and had a six-month-old daughter.

Gridin committed his first murder on July 31, 1989, killing 16-year-old Zhana Terenchuk on the porch of her house. He attempted three more unsuccessful attacks on girls, one of them giving a detailed description of the "Lifter." A month later, Gridin committed the murders of Danzili Usmanova and Lyudmila Pozdnyakova, leaving a fingerprint at one of the sites. On November 25, 1989, Gridin attempted another attack, but the girl gave him serious resistance, and he ran in fear, dropping his hat and glasses. It was because of these signs that he was soon detained, since it -20 °C on the street, and Gridin stood out too much from the crowd. In addition, at the time of his arrest a knife was taken away from him.

The Gridin case caused a wide resonance in society. The people were furious and demanded the public execution of the murderer. The trial began in the fall of 1990 and was accompanied by popular unrest: people demanded that the criminal be sentenced to the most severe sentence.

On October 3, 1990, the Chelyabinsk Regional Court sentenced Gridin to death, but the sentence was commuted life imprisonment in December 1993. Gridin was imprisoned on Ognenny Ostrov in the Vologda Oblast.

In 2000, Gridin appealed to the United Nations Human Rights Committee, which admitted that there were violations in his case. However, the Russian leadership refused to release him, citing the fact that after his arrest attacks on women ceased.

In 2013, the crew of the TV program "Investigation conducted..." visited Dmitry Gridin in the colony in Vologda Oblast. In the interview, he announced his intention to apply for parole in 2014, 25 years after his arrest.

In 2014, he tried to challenge the Presidential Decree on pardon, but the application was refused. Gridin challenged the refusal, but the Supreme Court of Russia left court ruling unchanged. In the same year, Gridin, after 25 years of imprisonment, filed a motion on the UDO, but the Belozersky District Court issued a decision to refuse parole. Three years later, in the summer of 2017, Gridin filed a motion for the second time, but the court again refused him, after which Gridin filed an appeal with the Vologoda Regional Court against the Belozersky Court's decision, but the appeal was rejected. Even after more than 28 years of imprisonment, Gridin has not admitted his guilt.

See also
 List of Russian serial killers

References

External links 
 The last living maniac of the USSR. Kanevsky met with the Magnitogorsk "Lifter". Magnitogorsk Information Agency (April 7, 2013). Accessed August 10, 2015
 Documentary film "The investigation was conducted...'The Lifter" on YouTube
 Ulyana Shevchenko. Magnitogorsk maniac nicknamed "The Lifter" is going for freedom. Komsomolskaya Pravda, Chelyabinsk (April 18, 2013). Accessed May 25, 2013.
 Zhenya Shezkhina. Interview from the other world. Grani.ru (August 11, 2004). Accessed May 18, 2015
 Irina Korotkikh. Maniacs of the former did not happen. Magnitogorsk Metal Newspaper (November 16, 2013). Accessed May 18, 2015

1968 births
Living people
Male serial killers
Prisoners sentenced to death by the Soviet Union
Russian murderers of children
Russian prisoners sentenced to death
Russian serial killers
Soviet murderers of children
Soviet prisoners sentenced to death
Soviet serial killers